The visa policy of Lebanon deals with the requirements which a foreign national wishing to enter the Republic of Lebanon must meet to be permitted to travel to, enter and remain in the country.

Lebanese visas are documents issued by the Ministry of Foreign Affairs and its subsequent diplomatic missions abroad with the stated goal of regulating and facilitating migratory flows.

Visitors to the Republic of Lebanon must obtain a visa from one of the Diplomatic missions of the Republic of Lebanon unless they come from one of the seven visa-exempt countries and territories or one of the 81 other countries and territories whose citizens are eligible for a visa on arrival.

Citizens of member nations of the Gulf Cooperation Council and Jordan may travel to Republic of Lebanon without visa limits for a maximum stay of six months per year. An identity document is accepted in lieu of a passport for Jordanian citizens. Citizens of Turkey are granted a multiple entry visa valid for a maximum stay of three months per six months while citizens of the 81 other countries and territories are granted a visa on arrival for a maximum stay of one month, extendable for two additional months at Beirut International Airport or any other port of entry if they are holding a telephone number, an address in the Republic of Lebanon, a non-refundable return or circle trip ticket, and there are no Israeli stamps, visas, or seals on their passport. All visitors must hold a passport valid for three months beyond the period of intended stay and with two blank pages.

Visa runs are not allowed, meaning that if foreigners wish to re-enter the Republic of Lebanon after their visa-free or VoA period has expired they should obtain a visa.

Admission and transit is refused to nationals of Israel and Kosovo. Travelers who hold passports that contain stamps, visas, or seals for Israel will be denied entry into Lebanon and may be subject to arrest or detention. Even if their travel documents currently do not have Israeli stamps or visas, persons seeking entry into the Republic of Lebanon who have previously traveled to Israel may still face arrest or detention if this travel is disclosed. The government of Lebanon has the authority to refuse admission to other countries' citizens and to detain them for further inspection.

Children under 15 years of age, of all nationalities travelling on their parents' passports must be accompanied by the passport holder, otherwise they must hold their own passport.

Visa policy map

As of right 
The following citizens do not require a visa to enter, reside, study, and work indefinitely in the Republic of Lebanon without any immigration requirements:

1 – May enter with a national identity card, individual civil status record, expired passport or civil extract issued by the Republic of Lebanon to passengers of Lebanese descent holding a foreign passport
2 – A law passed in 1995 prevents Palestinian Stateless persons and refugees in the Republic of Lebanon from working in over 70 jobs, including professional, mercantile and administrative jobshttp://www.anera.org/wp-content/uploads/2013/03/LEBRefugeeReport.pdf

Visa exemption 
Holders of passports of the following seven countries and territories do not require a visa to visit the Republic of Lebanon through Beirut International Airport or any other port of entry if they are holding a telephone number, an address in the Republic of Lebanon, a non-refundable return or circle trip ticket, and there are no Israeli stamps, visas, or seals on their passport. An identity document is accepted in lieu of a passport for Jordanian citizens:

Other visa exemptions 
Visa is not required for travelers of Lebanese origins traveling with any foreign passport and with a valid Lebanese national identity card, an expired Lebanese passport or a Lebanese civil document are exempted from visa requirements and admitted as citizens of the Republic of Lebanon.
Visa is not required for holders of diplomatic, official, or service passports issued by Colombia for a maximum stay of 90 days if they are holding a telephone number, an address in the Republic of Lebanon, a non-refundable return or circle trip ticket, and there are no Israeli stamps, visas, or seals on their passport.
Visa is not required for holders of diplomatic or official passports issued by Paraguay for a maximum stay of 6 months and 1 month respectively if they are holding a telephone number, an address in the Republic of Lebanon, a non-refundable return or circle trip ticket, and there are no Israeli stamps, visas, or seals on their passport.
Visa is not required for holders of diplomatic or service passports issued by Venezuela for a maximum stay of 6 months and 1 month respectively if they are holding a telephone number, an address in the Republic of Lebanon, a non-refundable return or circle trip ticket, and there are no Israeli stamps, visas, or seals on their passport.
Visa is not required for all Merchant Seamen who are citizens of Bahrain, Kuwait, Oman, Qatar, Saudi Arabia, and the United Arab Emirates but must hold a Seaman Book and Letter of Employment or Letter or Guarantee from the shipping company if arriving by air in order to board a ship, or if arriving by ship in order to board an aircraft and are holding a telephone number, an address in the Republic of Lebanon, a non-refundable return or circle trip ticket, and there are no Israeli stamps, visas, or seals on their passport.
Visa is not required for a maximum stay of 24 hours for holders of a travel document (Titre de Voyage) issued by Syria to stateless persons and refugees holding a residence permit issued by a third country, continuing to Syria, and have previously traveled out of Beirut
Visa is not required for United Nations' staff provided holding a diplomatic card issued by the Ministry of Foreign Affairs of the Republic of Lebanon for a maximum stay of 6 months per year, and are holding a telephone number, an address in the Republic of Lebanon, a non-refundable return or circle trip ticket, and there are no Israeli stamps, visas, or seals on their passport.
Visa is not required for holders of a Laissez-Passer issued by the United Nations and are travelling on duty if they are holding a telephone number, an address in the Republic of Lebanon, a non-refundable return or circle trip ticket, and there are no Israeli stamps, visas, or seals on their passport.
Visa is not required for Members of the Deterrent, Emergency, UN Interim (UNIFIL) and UN Security Forces provided holding Military Identity Cards for a maximum stay of 6 months per year if they are holding a telephone number, an address in the Republic of Lebanon, a non-refundable return or circle trip ticket, and there are no Israeli stamps, visas, or seals on their passport.

Visa On Arrival (VOA) 
Holders of the passports issued by the following 80 countries and territories are granted visa on arrival for a maximum stay of 1 months, extendable for 2 additional months at Beirut International Airport or any other port of entry  if they are holding a telephone number, an address in the Republic of Lebanon, a non-refundable return or circle trip ticket, and there are no Israeli stamps, visas, or seals on their passport:

Visa is granted on arrival for holders of service or special passports issued by Philippines for a maximum stay of 1 month, extendable for 2 additional months  at Beirut International Airport or any other port of entry if they are holding a telephone number, an address in the Republic of Lebanon, a non-refundable return or circle trip ticket, and there are no Israeli stamps, visas, or seals on their passport.
 Visa on arrival for diplomatic passport holders issued by any country with formal relations with the Republic of Lebanon if they are holding a telephone number, an address in the Republic of Lebanon, a non-refundable return or circle trip ticket, and there are no Israeli stamps, visas, or seals on their passport.

Conditional Visa On Arrival (VOA) 
Citizens of the following 16 countries and territories can obtain a visa on arrival at Beirut International Airport or any other port of entry if they are holding a copy of a reservation in a 3 to 5 star hotel or private residential address with telephone number in the Republic of Lebanon, at least 2,000 USD in cash, a non-refundable return or circle trip ticket, and there are no Israeli stamps, visas, or seals on their passport.

Visa is granted on arrival for spouses and children is they are travelling on a foreign passport and are accompanied by at least one Lebanese spouse or parent holding a Lebanese Passport or a Lebanese ID card. This however, does not apply for Palestinian refugees born to Lebanese mothers.
Visa is granted on arrival for a maximum stay of 11 months for Businessmen, Directors, General Managers, Employers, Physicians, Engineers and Lawyers possessing a valid residence permit in any of the Gulf Cooperation Council Countries, if that the term of the  granted visa doesn’t exceed the validity of the concerned person's passport and residence. The airlines companies are in charge of checking the residence's validity prior to boarding. As for the wives and children of this category, they are granted visas according to the conditions concerning the entry of individuals of same nationalities in case that they do not possess a valid residence in the one of the Gulf Countries and are telephone number, an address in the Republic of Lebanon, a non-refundable return or circle trip ticket, and there are no Israeli stamps, visas, or seals on their passport.
Visa is granted on arrival for tourist groups composed of a minimum of eight people for stays of more than 3 days if being sponsored by a registered tour operator in the Republic of Lebanon having sent their application at least two days prior to arrival for a maximum stay of 6 months at Beirut International Airport or any other port of entry if they are holding a telephone number, an address in the Republic of Lebanon, a non-refundable return or circle trip ticket, and there are no Israeli stamps, visas, or seals on their passport.
Visa is granted on arrival for holders of a written confirmation issued by the General Directorate of General Security that the visa has been approved before departure at Beirut International Airport or any other port of entry if they are holding a telephone number, an address in the Republic of Lebanon, a non-refundable return or circle trip ticket, and there are no Israeli stamps, visas, or seals on their passport
Visa is granted on arrival for maids of those accredited to citizens of the Republic of the Republic of Lebanon for a maximum stay of 6 months at Beirut International Airport or any other port of entry if they are travelling with their sponsor, and are holding a telephone number, an address in the Republic of Lebanon, a non-refundable return or circle trip ticket, and there are no Israeli stamps, visas, or seals on their passport.
Visa is granted on arrival for holders of passports issued by Syria for a maximum stay of 48 hours at Beirut International Airport or any other port of entry if passing through the Republic of Lebanon on their way to Syria and there are no Israeli stamps, visas, or seals on their passport.
Visa is granted on arrival for holders of passports issued by Syria for a maximum stay of the duration of the pre-arranged hotel accommodation Beirut International Airport or any other port of entry if they are holding a cash amount equivalent to the sum of one thousand US Dollars or an authentic cheque of the same value from a recognized bank, a proof of pre-arranged hotel accommodation, a family book if accompanied by family members, a telephone number, an address in the Republic of Lebanon, a non-refundable return or circle trip ticket, and there are no Israeli stamps, visas, or seals on their passport.
Visa is granted on arrival for holders of passports issued by Syria for a maximum stay of 1 month at Beirut International Airport or any other port of entry if they are holding a proof of business or occupation, a letter of invitation/guarantee issued by an inviting party, a family book if accompanied by family members, a telephone number, an address in the Republic of Lebanon, a non-refundable return or circle trip ticket, and there are no Israeli stamps, visas, or seals on their passport.
Visa is granted on arrival for holders of passports issued by Syria for a maximum stay of 6 months at Beirut International Airport or any other port of entry if they are holding a proof of property, a family book if accompanied by family members, a telephone number, an address in the Republic of Lebanon, a non-refundable return or circle trip ticket, and there are no Israeli stamps, visas, or seals on their passport.
Visa is granted on arrival for holders of passports issued by Syria for a maximum stay of 72 hours at Beirut International Airport or any other port of entry, if they are travelling on business and are holding medical reports/certificates of treatment/condition, a family book if accompanied by family members, a telephone number, an address in the Republic of Lebanon, a non-refundable return or circle trip ticket, and there are no Israeli stamps, visas, or seals on their passport.
Visa is granted on arrival for holders of passports issued by Syria for a maximum stay of 48 hours at Beirut International Airport or any other port of entry, if they are visiting a foreign embassy and are holding proof of scheduled appointment, a family book if accompanied by family members, a telephone number, an address in the Republic of Lebanon, a non-refundable return or circle trip ticket, and there are no Israeli stamps, visas, or seals on their passport.
Visa is granted on arrival for holders of passports issued by Syria for a maximum stay of 7 days at Beirut International Airport or any other port of entry if they are travelling to study in an accredited school or university and are holding a letter of acceptance issued by a college/university or college/university ID, an applicable diplomas/certificates, a copy of their passport, a family book if accompanied by family members, a telephone number, an address in the Republic of Lebanon, a non-refundable return or circle trip ticket, and there are no Israeli stamps, visas, or seals on their passport.

Approval requirement from the Lebanese Immigration General Directorate for General Security 
The following are required to obtain a pre-approval from the General Directorate of General Security in addition to a visa:

GDGS Immigration Pre-Approval Documents Exemptions 
The following cases are exempted from all the conditions concerning the address, the non-refundable return or circle trip ticket, and the pre-approval from the General Directorate of General Security:
The wife of a citizen of the Republic of Lebanon, who did not work previously as an artist or a masseuse, after presenting a document asserting the marriage. Marital status must be officially registered for more than one year
The wife of a Palestinian refugee in the Republic of Lebanon or a holder of a valid identity card under consideration and who did not work previously as an artist or a masseuse, after presenting a document asserting the marriage. Marital status must be officially registered for more than one year
The wife of a Syrian citizen accompanying him and who did not work previously as an artist or masseuse in the Republic of Lebanon, provided that the marriage is registered on the husband’s family register or by presenting a document proving the marriage. Marital status must be officially registered for more than one year
Women who did not work previously as artists or masseuses in the Republic of Lebanon, accompanying their husband, their child, one of their parents, brothers
The mother in law of a citizen of the Republic of Lebanon after presenting a document asserting the kinship
Women coming among official delegations, or those holding private, special or diplomatic passports
The wife of a citizen of the Republic of Lebanon who has previously worked as an artist or a masseuse and left the Republic of Lebanon for a period of more than one year, if she is accompanied by one or more of her children from this marriage after presenting the documents proving the marriage
The wife of a foreigner non-Arabic man who has previously worked as an artist or a masseuse and had left the Republic of Lebanon for a period more than one year, provided that she is in his company and that she holds a document proving the marriage

Applying for a visa 
All visitors must apply in person at an Embassy or a General Consulate of the Republic of Lebanon, fill in the application form and pay the application processing fee at a visa application center. Citizens of the seven visa-exempt countries and territories or the 81 countries and territories whose citizens are eligible for a visa on arrival can obtain the visa before travel but are exempted from submitting proof documents but will still be required to pay a processing fee

The visa application will be sent to the Ministry of Foreign Affairs in the Republic of Lebanon by the diplomatic pouch. One should apply one month before travel date. Head of Missions outside the Republic of Lebanon have the right to issue visas to the Republic of Lebanon given that the visa grant is "under the responsibility of the Head of Mission" , except in the cases of Palestinian refugees or holders of passports issued by the Palestinian Authority or Jordan without a national ID number

A visitor's visa for a single entry costs $35 and for a multiple entry costs $70 for stays up to 3 months. For applicants holding a managerial or a more senior position the visa is processed at the Embassy or General Consulate of the Republic of Lebanon within 2-3 working days, for applicants holding a non-managerial position, the visa is processed between 6 and 8 weeks if approved by the Directorate General of General Security in the Republic of Lebanon.

Visa types and requirements

Tourist visa 
Eligibility

Tourists
People visiting relatives or friends
People wishing to visit Lebanon for a short period for the purpose of making or meeting with businesses, contacts, attending trade fairs, speaking at conferences etc.
Unpaid participation in athletic or artistic event or competition. An invitation letter from the sponsoring organization in the Republic of Lebanon is required
Unpaid participation in a scientific/academic seminar or conference sponsored by a research or academic institution. An invitation letter from the sponsoring organization in the Republic of Lebanon is required.

Temporary & permanent residence visa 
Foreigners wishing to live and work in the Republic of Lebanon are required to apply for a temporary residence visa. To obtain a temporary visa for employment purposes, the worker needs to secure a job offer from a company based in the Republic of Lebanon or government department, or a foreign company based in the Republic of Lebanon, and the company is required to apply to the Immigration Division of the Ministry of Labor on the worker's behalf. The criteria for approval of an employment visa include suitable educational qualifications or work experience, a secured employment contract in the Republic of Lebanon, proof of adequate means of subsistence in the Republic of Lebanon, police confirmation that the worker has no criminal record, and a satisfactory medical examination. All official documents must be translated into Arabic, French, or English and 'legalized' by the embassy or general consulate of the Republic of Lebanon abroad. The application processing period is normally around 1-3 weeks. Employment visas are issued for a specific job, and are not transferable between employers in the Republic of Lebanon without permission. Visas are also issued to the employment visa holder's spouse and children

Foreign citizens aged over 50 can apply for a permanent visa if they have a pension of at least 3,000,000 Lebanese Lira (US$2,000) per month and will transfer it to the Republic of Lebanon every month. Visas may also issued to the visa holder's spouse and children. Applicants for permanent residence visas are required to submit their passport, birth certificate, marriage certificate if applicable, documentary proof of the pension and a bank declaration authorizing he monthly transfer to the Republic of Lebanon, and a police certificate of no criminal record, issued within the last 90 days

Transit visa 
A Transit Without Visa (TWOV) applies if the traveler is passing through an international transit area of at Beirut International Airport in order to board a connecting or to proceed by the same flight to an international destination, without entering the Republic of Lebanon or Clearing Immigration. This however does not apply to:
Travelers holding stand-by or refundable tickets
Citizens of the following 18 countries:

This visa must be applied for at least 2 days before the trip, provided submitting a copy of a visa or residence permit related to the country of destination and the airline ticket

Courtesy visa 
It is granted for VIPs by Embassies or General Consulates of the Republic of Lebanon abroad or by the General Director of General Security free of charge provided they present a letter from their mission or the ministry of foreign affairs or the employer explaining the purpose of the travel

Collective visa 
It is granted for groups, and the fee is collected from each member of the groups

Work visa 
It is granted for 3 months costs 200.000 LP based on a pre-approval from the Ministry of Labor. All of the documents for a tourist visa are needed, as well as an invitation letter from sponsor or trade partner in the Republic of Lebanon and their contact information (showing period of stay and name, address and phone number of sponsor), a proof that the trade partner is certified in the Republic of Lebanon, and a proof that there is a relationship between applicant and the trade partner by means of a commercial announcement

Visitor Statistics 
Most visitors arriving to Lebanon were from the following countries of nationality:

See also 

Constitution of Lebanon
Driving licence in Lebanon
Foreign relations of Lebanon
History of Lebanon
Lebanese diaspora
Lebanese identity card
Lebanese passport
Politics of Lebanon
Vehicle registration plates of Lebanon
Visa requirements for Lebanese citizens

References

External links 
Lebanese General Directorate for General Security-Entry Visas
Lebanese Ministry of Foreign Affairs-Consular Information 

Lebanon
Foreign relations of Lebanon